Shapinsay is one of the Orkney Islands off the north coast of mainland Scotland. There is one village on the island, Balfour, from which roll-on/roll-off car ferries sail to Kirkwall on the Orkney Mainland. Balfour Castle, built in the Scottish Baronial style, is one of the island's most prominent features, a reminder of the Balfour family's domination of Shapinsay during the 18th and 19th centuries; the Balfours transformed life on the island by introducing new agricultural techniques. Other landmarks include a standing stone, an Iron Age broch, a souterrain and a salt-water shower.

It is low-lying and fertile, consequently most of the area is given over to farming. Shapinsay has two nature reserves and is notable for its bird life.

At the 2011 census, Shapinsay had a population of 307. The economy of the island is primarily based on agriculture with the exception of a few small businesses that are largely tourism-related. Plans for the construction of a wind turbine are under consideration.

Etymology 
Unlike most of the larger Orkney islands, the derivation of the name 'Shapinsay' is not obvious. The final 'ay' is from the Old Norse for island, but the first two syllables are more difficult to interpret. Haswell-Smith (2004) suggests the root may be hjalpandis-øy (helpful island) owing to the presence of a good harbour, although anchorages are plentiful in the archipelago. The first written record dates from 1375 in a reference to Scalpandisay, which may suggest a derivation from Judge's island. Another suggestion is Hyalpandi's island, although no one of that name is known to be associated with Shapinsay.

History

Early history 

Standing stones provide evidence of the island's human occupation since Neolithic times. According to Tacitus, the Roman general Agricola subdued the inhabitants of the Orkney Islands, and a local legend holds that he landed on Shapinsay. During the 18th century, a croft named Grukalty was renamed Agricola (which is also Latin for "farmer"). Roman coins have been found on Shapinsay, but they may have been brought to the island by traders.

Shapinsay is briefly mentioned in the Norse sagas. The Saga of Haakon Haakonsson states that Haakon IV of Norway anchored in Elwick Bay before sailing south to eventual defeat at the Battle of Largs.

18th century 

The 18th century saw the beginnings of change to agriculture on Shapinsay, courtesy of the Balfour family. The family owned the estate of Sound, which covered the western part of the island. Sound had passed from the Tulloch family to the Buchanan family in 1627. John Buchanan was a royal servant and his wife Margaret Hartsyde was from a Kirkwall family.

In 1674, Arthur Buchanan built the house of Sound, where Balfour Castle now stands. His granddaughter married James Fea, who is best known for his role in the capture of the Orkney Pirate John Gow. Fea was a supporter of the Jacobite rising of 1715, and the house was burned by Hanoverian troops in revenge. The estate was acquired by Andrew Ross, Stewart Depute in Orkney of the Earl of Morton. Ross's heirs, the Lindsay brothers, sold the estate to Thomas Balfour in 1782. Balfour had previously rented the Bu of Burray, a large manor farm on another Orkney island, but had insufficient wealth to acquire the estate even though his wife had inherited a legacy on the death of her aristocratic brother. To raise the necessary funds, Balfour had to sell his military commission and borrow from his brother, John, who was prospering in India with the East India Company. Once installed on the island, he built a new house, Cliffdale, and founded the village of Shoreside, now known as Balfour. He also reformed the local agriculture, enclosing fields and constructing farm buildings.

William Irving was born c. 1740 in the small hamlet of Quholm in the northeast of the island. He became a sailor before emigrating to New York in 1763. One of his sons was Washington Irving, author of Rip van Winkle and the first American author to gain international recognition.

Marjory Meason, a native of Shapinsay, was the last person to be executed in Orkney, in 1728. She was a young servant, hanged in Kirkwall for the murder of a child. The execution is recorded as requiring 24 armed men, not including officers, and costing £15 8s.

During this period, burning kelp was a mainstay of the island economy. Thomas Balfour's income from the kelp industry brought him four times the income that farming did.

19th century 

The 19th century saw more radical change in Shapinsay. Thomas Balfour's grandson, David Balfour, transformed the island after inheriting the family estate, which by 1846 encompassed the whole of Shapinsay. Tenants were required to enclose and drain the land or pay for the estate to do it in the form of a surcharge added to their rents. In 1846,  on Shapinsay consisted of arable land. New crops and breeds of cattle and sheep were also introduced. Balfour's reforms were described as "the fountain and source of Orkney Improvement."

Balfour also gave the island its most noticeable landmark when he recruited an Edinburgh architect, David Bryce, to transform Cliffdale House into the Scottish Baronial Balfour Castle. Other buildings he added to the island include the porter's lodge (now a public house called The Gatehouse), a water mill, a school, and a gasworks that remained operational until the 1920s. The gasworks is in the form of a round tower with a corbelled parapet of red brick and carved stones—including one possibly removed from Noltland Castle on Westray, which is inscribed with the year 1725. The structure appears to be fortified, in accordance with Balfour's intention to give the village a medieval appearance. David Balfour was also responsible for the construction of Mill Dam, a wetland which was once the water supply for the mill and is now an RSPB nature reserve.

Fishing for herring and cod also grew in importance during the 19th century. Herring fishing was expanding generally in Scotland at that time, with fishing stations being set up in remote areas. Herring fishing began in 1814 on Stronsay and soon spread throughout the Orkney Islands. By the middle of the century, Shapinsay had 50 herring boats. Cod became important largely because the Napoleonic Wars forced English fishing boats to fish further north. Local fishermen, who had been catching fish using lines from small boats for centuries, also began trawling for cod. However, this was largely a part-time venture, unlike in Shetland, where many inhabitants made a living from fishing. A saying originating from this time states, "a Shetlander is a fisherman with a croft, while an Orcadian is a farmer with a boat." Consequently, fishermen from outside the Orkney Islands earned a large share of the profits. Helliar Holm's beaches were used to dry both herring and cod after they had been salted. With the end of the Napoleonic Wars, which led to cheaper sources of soda ash becoming available from continental Europe, the kelp industry collapsed by 1830. This collapse helped fuel agricultural reform, as crofters accustomed to earning a second income had to now earn more from farming.

20th century 

The Balfour estate sold its farms on Shapinsay between 1924 and 1928. This was a common occurrence in Orkney at the time as wealthy landowners moved to more lucrative forms of investment. Farms were generally sold to the sitting tenant or to their neighbours who wished to expand.

The 20th century saw many changes in farming on Shapinsay. Mechanised implements came to the island, particularly after the Second World War. In common with the rest of Orkney, the amount of land given over to growing grass increased. The growing of grain (with the exception of barley) and turnips steadily declined as these were replaced as winter fodder for livestock by silage, usually harvested by mechanical forage harvesters.

Orkney was a strategic site during both World Wars, and Shapinsay was no exception. In 1917, during the First World War, the  Swiftsure was hit by a mine 4 kilometres (2.5 mi) east of Haco's Ness and sank in 19 metres (62 ft) of water with the loss of a single life. The site of the wreck was not discovered until 1997.

During the Second World War, gun batteries were built on the island. A twin six pounder emplacement at Galtness Battery on the coast at Salt Ness protected the Wide Firth from German torpedo boats. A Castle Battery was operational from 1941 to 1943, as was an anti-aircraft battery. Mains electricity arrived on Shapinsay in the 1970s, when an underwater cable was laid from Kirkwall.

The trend towards more intensive farming began to be partially reversed by the end of the century as more environmentally friendly practices were encouraged by government and European Union grants. For example, Richard Zawadzki, owner of Balfour Mains (the largest farm on the island), ceased to breed livestock (instead keeping animals bred elsewhere) and grew less grain (some barley is still grown on the farm). Instead, some of the land is now managed under a Habitat Creation Scheme, which aims to encourage natural vegetation, wild flowers and nesting birds by limiting grazing and reducing the use of chemical fertilisers.

Tourism started to become important in the latter half of the century; the first restaurant to incorporate bed and breakfast facilities opened in 1980.

Geography 

The east coast is composed of low cliffs and has several sea caves, including the picturesque geo at the extreme northern tip known as Geo of Ork. Elwick Bay is a sheltered anchorage on the south coast, facing the Orkney mainland; the island's largest settlement, Balfour, is at the western end of the bay.

The island has several ayres, or storm beaches, which form narrow spits of shingle or sand cutting across the landward and seaward ends of shallow bays. They can sometimes cut off a body of water from the sea, forming shallow freshwater lochs known as oyces. Examples include Vasa Loch and Lairo Water.

There are several small islands in the vicinity including Broad Shoal, Grass Holm and Skerry of Vasa. Helliar Holm is a tidal islet at the eastern entrance to the main harbour at Balfour; it has a small lighthouse and a ruined broch. The String, a stretch of water that lies between Helliar Holm and the mainland, has strong tidal currents.

Geology 

In common with most of the Orkney isles, Shapinsay has a bedrock formed from Old Red Sandstone, which is approximately 400 million years old and was laid down in the Devonian period. These thick deposits accumulated as earlier Silurian rocks, uplifted by the formation of Pangaea, eroded and then deposited into river deltas. The freshwater Lake Orcadie existed on the edges of these eroding mountains, stretching from Shetland to the southern Moray Firth. The composition of Shapinsay is mostly of the Rousay flagstone group from the Lower Middle Devonian, with some Eday flagstone in the southeast formed in wetter conditions during the later Upper Devonian. The latter is regarded as a better quality building material than the former. At Haco's Ness in the south east corner of the island is a small outcrop of amygdaloidal diabase. The island is overlain with a fertile layer of boulder clay formed during the Pleistocene glaciations.

Flora and fauna 

The island's bird life is particularly rich in waders such as curlew and redshank, found at The Ouse and Veantro Bay, and gull and tern colonies on the rockier shores and cliffs. Pintail, shovelers and whooper swans are regular summer visitors, and there are also breeding populations of shelducks, hen harriers and Arctic skuas. There is an introduced population of red-legged partridges. Otters can be seen at the Ouse, Lairo Water and Vasa Loch, and at various places around the coast along with common seals and Atlantic grey seals. There are plans to build a hide to allow visitors to observe seals without disturbing them. Shapinsay and Hoy are the only two larger Orkney islands that lack the Orkney vole (Microtus arvalis orcadensis). Wildflowers abound in the summer, and the lichen Melaspilea interjecta, which is endemic to Scotland, is found in only three locations, including Shapinsay. In addition to the RSPB reserve at Mill Dam there is a Scottish Wildlife Trust reserve at East Hill in the southeast.

Demography 

The highest recorded population for Shapinsay is 974, in 1881. Since then, the population of the island has steadily declined; less than a third of that number was recorded in the 2001 census. The rate of absolute population loss was lower in the last decades of the 20th century than it had been in the first half of that century. In 2001, Shapinsay had a population of 300, a decline of 6.8% from 322 in 1991. This was greater than the population decline for Orkney overall in the same period, which was 1.9%. However, the loss in population on Shapinsay was less than that experienced by most Orkney islands, most of which experienced declines of more than 10%. The number of persons per hectare on Shapinsay was 0.1, similar to the 0.2 persons per hectare across Orkney. At the time of the 2011 census the usually resident population had increased to 307. During the same period Scottish island populations as a whole grew by 4% to 103,702.

Of the island's 300 inhabitants recorded in 2001, 283 were born in the United Kingdom (227 in Scotland and 56 in England). Seventeen were born outside the United Kingdom (four elsewhere in Europe, four in Asia, four in North America, one in South America and four in Oceania). By age group, 85 of the inhabitants were under 30 years of age, 134 were aged between 30 and 59, and 71 were age 60 and over.

Notable buildings 

Balfour Castle dominates views of the southwest of the island and can be seen from the tower of St. Magnus Cathedral in Kirkwall. The castle library features a secret passage hidden behind a false set of bookshelves. The Balfours escaped unwelcome visitors through this passageway, which leads to the conservatory door, enabling the butler to truthfully tell visitors that the Balfours were not in the house. Another feature of the castle is the stags' heads with gaslights at the tips of their antlers, although these are no longer used as working lights. Though built around an older structure that dates at least from the 18th century, the present castle was built in 1847, commissioned by Colonel David Balfour, and designed by Edinburgh architect David Bryce.

Other buildings constructed by David Balfour include the Dishan Tower, known locally as The Douche. This is a saltwater shower building with a dovecote on top. A local landmark due to its high visibility when approaching the island by sea, the building is now in a serious state of disrepair, with roofing slates missing and the dovecote in danger of collapsing.

A more ancient dwelling on Shapinsay is the Iron Age Broch of Burroughston. Only the interior of this partially buried building has been excavated, allowing visitors to look down into the broch from the surrounding mound. The surviving drystone walls rise to about three metres (10 ft) and are more than four metres (13 ft) thick in some places.

The broch shows more evidence of David Balfour's influence on Shapinsay. He arranged for the site to be excavated by the archaeologists George Petrie and Sir William Dryden in 1861. The site was neglected after the excavation, slowly filling up with vegetation and rubble before being cleared in 1994.

Shapinsay Heritage Centre is located in Balfour's former smithy, along with a craft shop and a cafe. The castle's former gatehouse is now the village public house.

Economy 

In common with the other Orkney islands, Shapinsay is fertile agricultural land, with farms specialising in beef and lamb which export thousands of cattle and sheep annually. Orkney Ferries provides transport for pedestrians and vehicles, proximity to Kirkwall permitting closer contacts with the Orkney Mainland than is possible for most of the other North Isles. There are six crossings per day, the journey lasting about 25 minutes, which allows for a moderate amount of commuting. Between 1893 and 1964, the island was served by the steamer Iona. The Orkney Islands Council has considered building a tunnel to the Orkney Mainland. Balfour Castle was run as a hotel by the family of Captain Tadeusz Zawadzki, a Polish cavalry officer, but is now in use as a private house.

The Shapinsay development trust is working on the island's community plan, and owns the island's wind turbine, which was completed in August 2011 after the community voted for its construction. According to the development trust, the turbine could earn more than £5 million during its 25-year lifetime.

Small businesses on Shapinsay include a jam and chutney manufacturer, which uses traditional methods, and a studio offering residential arts courses such as stained glass crafting.

Education and culture 
Shapinsay has a primary school, which in the 2006–7 academic year had 26 pupils. Before 1995, the island also had a secondary school but lost this because of falling enrolment and improved transport links with Kirkwall, to where Shapinsay secondary pupils now travel. The school doubles as a community centre and is host to a learning centre supported by the UHI Millennium Institute. This centre uses the internet, email and video-conferencing to allow students in Shapinsay to study without leaving the island.

In December 2006, the pupils staged a joint Christmas show with a school in Grinder, Norway,  from Shapinsay. The schools used the internet to collaborate, supported by BT Group (BT), which upgraded the school's broadband connection. The finale of the show involved the Norwegian pupils singing Away in a Manger in English while the Shapinsay pupils responded with En Stjerne Skinner I Natt in Norwegian. This multilingual collaboration was somewhat easier for the Grinder pupils, who are taught English from the age of six. This collaboration was part of an ongoing relationship between the schools, whose children exchange letters and cards. Shapinsay school's headteacher has visited the Norwegian school, and there are plans for a reciprocal visit in 2008.

Shapinsay Community School has gained a Silver Award under the international Eco-Schools programme. School pupils have carried out an energy audit, helped to plant more than 600 trees close to the school and carried out energy saving campaigns. Shapinsay pupils have also won an award from the Scottish Crofters Commission for producing a booklet on crofting on the island.

Folklore 
Cubbie Roo, the best known Orcadian giant, has a presence on Shapinsay. He was originally based on the historical figure Kolbein Hrúga, who built Cubbie Roo's Castle in 1150 on the isle of Wyre, which is possibly the oldest castle in Scotland, and was mentioned in the Orkneyinga Saga. However, the figure Cubbie Roo has departed far from his historical origins and has become a giant in the fashion that Finn MacCool (legendary builder of the Giant's Causeway) has in parts of Scotland and Ireland. He is said to have lived on the island of Wyre and used Orkney's islands as stepping stones. Many large stones on Orkney islands, including Shapinsay, are said to have been thrown or left there by the giant. Cubbie Roo's Burn is a waterway on Shapinsay that flows through a channel called Trolldgeo. Cubbie Roo's Lade is a pile of stones on the shore near Rothiesholm Head, the westmost point of Stronsay. This is supposedly the beginning of a bridge between the two islands that the giant had failed to complete. The name derives from the Old Norse trolla-hlad, meaning "giant's causeway".

In 1905, The Orcadian newspaper reported that a strange creature had been seen off the coast of Shapinsay. It was reportedly the size of a horse, with a spotted body covered in scales. Opinion on the creature's origin was divided, with some islanders believing it to be a sea serpent, while others opined that it was merely a large seal.

See also

 List of islands of Scotland

Notes

References

Bibliography

External links 

 Shapinsay Development Trust
 Shapinsay Tourism Group 

 
Islands of the Orkney Islands